Plastic Man (Patrick "Eel" O'Brian) is a superhero first appearing in Police Comics #1, originally published by Quality Comics and later acquired by DC Comics. Created by cartoonist Jack Cole, Plastic Man was one of the first superheroes to incorporate humor into mainstream action storytelling. This character has been published in several solo series and has interacted with other characters such as Batman and many others in the mainstream DC Universe as a member of the Justice League. He has additionally appeared in several television and video game adaptations, including a television show of his own named The Plastic Man Comedy/Adventure Show.

Publication history
Created by writer-artist Jack Cole, he first appeared in Police Comics #1 (August 1941).

One of Quality Comics' signature characters during the Golden Age of Comic Books, Plastic Man can stretch his body into any imaginable form, for example a ball or a car, etc. His adventures were known for their quirky, offbeat structure and surreal slapstick humor. When Quality Comics was shut down in 1956, DC Comics acquired many of its characters, integrating Plastic Man into the mainstream DC Universe and giving him a short-lived series in the 1960s.

The character starred in his own Saturday morning cartoon titled The Plastic Man Comedy/Adventure Show from 1979 to 1981 and was also a recurring character on Batman: The Brave and the Bold from 2008 to 2011. He was also mentioned in an episode of Justice League Unlimited but was never shown owing to ownership arguments  and copyright complaints. To get around these problems, the show used Elongated Man as a replacement.

Although the character has never been a significant commercial success, Plastic Man has been a favorite character of many modern comic book creators, including writer Grant Morrison, who included him in their 1990s revival of the Justice League; Art Spiegelman, who profiled Cole for The New Yorker magazine; painter Alex Ross, who has frequently included him in covers and stories depicting the Justice League; writer-artist Kyle Baker, who wrote and illustrated an award-winning Plastic Man series; and Frank Miller, who included him in the Justice League in the comics All Star Batman and Robin the Boy Wonder and Batman: The Dark Knight Strikes Again.

Fictional character biography

Original version by Jack Cole
Plastic Man was a crook named Patrick "Eel" O'Brian. Orphaned at age 10 and forced to live on the streets, he fell into a life of crime. As an adult, he became part of a burglary ring, specializing as a safecracker. During a late-night heist at the Crawford Chemical Works, he and his three fellow gang members were surprised by a night watchman. During the gang's escape, Eel was shot in the shoulder and doused with a large drum of unidentified chemical liquid. He escaped to the street only to discover that his gang had driven off without him.

Fleeing on foot and suffering increasing disorientation from the gunshot wound and the exposure to the chemical, Eel eventually passed out on the foothills of a mountain near the city. He awoke to find himself in a bed in a mountain retreat, being tended to by a monk who had discovered him unconscious that morning. This monk, sensing a capacity for great good in O'Brian, turned away police officers who had trailed Eel to the monastery. This act of faith and kindness—combined with the realization that his gang had left him to be captured without a moment's hesitation—fanned Eel's longstanding dissatisfaction with his criminal life and his desire to reform.

During his short convalescence at the monastery, he discovered that the chemical had entered his bloodstream and caused a radical physical change. His body now had all of the properties of rubber, allowing him to stretch, bounce and mold himself into any shape. He immediately determined to use his new abilities on the side of law and order, donning a red, black and yellow (later red and yellow) rubber costume and capturing criminals as Plastic Man. He concealed his true identity with a pair of white goggles and by re-molding his face. As O'Brian, he maintained his career and connections with the underworld as a means of gathering information on criminal activity.

Plastic Man soon acquired comic-relief sidekick Woozy Winks, who was originally enchanted so that nature itself would protect him from harm. This power was eventually removed from the character and Woozy became simply a bumbling yet loyal friend to Plastic Man.

In his original Golden Age/Quality Comics incarnation, Plastic Man eventually became a member of the city police force and then the FBI. By the time he became a federal officer, he had nearly completely abandoned his Eel O'Brian identity.

Phil Foglio version
After the 1985 Crisis on Infinite Earths, a 1988–1989 four-issue Plastic Man miniseries by Phil Foglio introduced a new version of Plastic Man: Eel O'Brian, abandoned by his criminal gang after being shot and exposed to the unidentified chemical, wandered the streets as his new powers developed, frightening others and bringing the police and National Guard down on him as a dangerous monster. Eel was at first oblivious to the changes to his body, but after realizing that he was the monster at large, he used his new abilities to escape his pursuers. Eel soon became so despondent over his new condition that he attempted suicide by jumping off a bridge.

Fortunately, he was interrupted by Woozy Winks, a former mental patient who was kicked out of an institution due to lack of funding (or as Woozy put it, "something called Reaganomics"), who desired nothing more than to return to the warm safety of a straitjacket and padded room. Eel and Woozy decided to work together and capitalize on Eel's new powers to make their fortunes (Eel wanting to get rich quick, Woozy just wanting his "old room" back), but couldn't decide whether there was more money in crime or crime-fighting, and resorted to flipping a coin to choose serving the law (though Woozy had his doubts early on). Eel ended up with the name 'Plastic Man' after a reporter misinterpreted his first choice of 'Elastic Man'. Eel and Woozy set up a detective agency in New York City and go on to have various misadventures together.

JLA
Plastic Man was made a prominent member of the Justice League during Grant Morrison's run on the title. The story arc "Rock of Ages" shows Batman recruiting Eel to infiltrate Lex Luthor's Injustice League in the guise of the Joker, which he does successfully. He notably engages in combat with the goddess Circe, proving immune to her magical ability to turn humans into animals. He is later made a full-time member of the League and aids the League in several battles, including against Prometheus, Julian September, General Wade Eiling, an upgraded version of Amazo, a White Martian who assumes the identity of Bruce Wayne, and Queen Bee. During this period he becomes close friends with fellow new members Steel (due to the fact that they are both "lateral thinkers") and Zauriel (Plastic Man later implies in the JLA: Heaven's Ladder graphic novel that his Catholic upbringing is a factor behind this, and Zauriel's existence is a testament to his faith). After the extended League dissolves at the end of the "World WarIII" arc, he is the only member other than the 'Big Seven' heroes (Superman, Batman, Wonder Woman, Aquaman, The Flash, Martian Manhunter and Green Lantern) to retain full-time membership in the JLA.

Plastic Man has also been instrumental in defeating several foes by himself, such as a Jokerized version of Dr. Polaris and the 'Burning Martian' persona of J'onn J'onzz (Martian Manhunter). He has played substantial roles in nearly every major team-up and crossover featuring the League of this era: with the Titans (The Technis Imperative), Young Justice (World Without Grownups), the Justice Society of America (Virtue and Vice, where he is one of the heroes to be possessed by one of the Seven Deadly Sins), the Avengers (the JLA/Avengers crossover) and even the Looney Tunes (in the humorous Superman & Bugs Bunny miniseries). In the Tower of Babel arc, Plastic Man is frozen and shattered into pieces by Ra's al Ghul's League of Assassins, as part of an attack against the Justice League. Though he is put together again, this experience traumatizes him severely and when it is discovered that the assassins were following methods devised by Batman, Eel joins Wonder Woman and Aquaman in voting Batman out of the League. The heroes reconcile in following issues.

The fact that Plastic Man was initially in the superhero business for the money has had an effect on his character development, notably in the storyline "Divided We Fall" by Mark Waid where he, along with other Justice League members, was separated into two people, his normal "civilian" identity and his superhero persona, by the manipulative wish-granting Id. While Plastic Man devolved from a person with a sense of humor into a constantly wisecracking and almost ineffectual idiot, the now "normal" Eel O'Brian struggled with the criminal tendencies he had suppressed as he had become comfortable with his role as a superhero and wondered if he had actually changed for the better at all or this was just part of the super-hero "act". Ultimately, Eel was the driving force behind the other transformed Leaguers banding together to re-join with their superheroic selves, noting that Bruce Wayne in particular was approaching a mental breakdown as he struggled with his rage over his parents' murder – having lacked the ability to do anything about it, as Batman was the identity that had 'inherited' his skills. Eel demonstrates this to the other divided Leaguers by savagely beating Bruce Wayne with a gun in the guise of a mugger to prove Wayne's ineffectiveness, and demonstrate the degree of psychological damage he has suffered due to the split. Later, Batman comments that it was a wise move "under the circumstances". Later, Plastic Man approaches Batman for help when he learns that Eel's estranged ten-year-old son Luke has fallen in with a gang of criminals, and has inherited his father's shape-shifting abilities, possibly to an even greater degree than Plastic Man's own. Plastic Man admits to Batman that he doesn't know if he ran away from being a father because he was enjoying his new life as a hero, or because he was afraid of becoming a parent for his son. Batman later intimidates Luke into returning home, and informs Plastic Man that he is disappointed in his cowardice, imagining that Eel would have shown Luke fatherly love; in reality, Plastic Man chose only to hide in Batman's utility belt during the whole encounter with Luke.

During the story arc "The Obsidian Age", Plastic Man and the other main members of the JLA were transported through time thousands of years earlier to the beginning days of Atlantis. During a battle with the antagonists, Plastic Man was frozen and then shattered into pieces. Having no way to locate all the pieces, much less fix him, with the technology of the day, the JLA returned to their own time. There they were eventually successful in finding all the pieces and restoring Plastic Man. Plas had been conscious the entire time but unable to move, which had a profoundly negative effect on his mind. He admitted he had lost his nerve and quit the JLA, hoping to live a regular life. This return to normalcy was made easier after a new encounter with his now-teenage son, which made Eel feel that the boy needed a father and a normal life. Eventually, Batman convinced Plas to return to his life as a super hero again when they needed his shape-shifting skills and immunity to telepathy to defeat the Martian Manhunter, who had regressed to a racial memory of the long-forgotten 'Burning Martians' after overcoming his weakness to fire. After a few more cases, Plastic Man is present at the memorial service held after this incarnation of the Justice League officially disbands during the Infinite Crisis storyline.

52, One Year Later, Countdown and Blackest Night
In the 2006 "One Year Later" DC Comics crossover storyline that followed the "Infinite Crisis" crossover, a young man with similar appearance and powers as Plastic Man appears briefly in the superteam series Teen Titans Vol. 3, #34 written by R.J. Carter. The character wears a white costume with red goggles, similar to that of Offspring, Plastic Man's son in the earlier 1999 DC miniseries The Kingdom by Mark Waid. While the Teen Titans story itself does not identify the character, page two of a published script supposedly by writer Geoff Johns' specifies it is "Plastic Man's son, Offspring". Plastic Man's son is also shown in costume, and identified as Offspring, in the 2006 weekly series 52 in Week 35 (written by Geoff Johns, Grant Morrison, Greg Rucka and Mark Waid) when he is injured while rescuing a number of the depowered Everyman heroes. Eventually, Plastic Man and Offspring come together as father and son and briefly even had an idyllic family set up until Plas was convinced that he couldn't deny his destiny as a super hero.

In Countdown to Mystery #1 (2007) written by Matthew Sturges, Plastic Man is seduced by Eclipso, being made to believe he is a joke among his fellow heroes, and the only way for him to get some respect is through Eclipso. He is later freed of this corruption by Bruce Gordon. Plastic Man makes his next appearance within the pages of Green Arrow/Black Canary #8 by Judd Winick, having been freed from a stasis tube by Green Arrow. His DNA is taken by Sivana and used to augment an amnesiac Connor Hawke, in a bid to turn the young hero into a brainwashed slave with a strong healing factor.

Plastic Man appeared for a brief period in the 2009 Justice League of America vol. 2 series written by Len Wein. After joining up with the team following the events of Final Crisis, Plastic Man has his effectiveness questioned by his teammate Dr. Light, which starts a fight between the two, which Vixen breaks up. Vixen reassigns Plastic Man to team up with Dr. Light to stop the Royal Flush Gang robbery. Though they experience some control issues between them, the Royal Flush Gang is defeated and Plastic Man and Dr. Light finally stop arguing.

During a massive battle at the Justice League Satellite in Justice League: Cry for Justice, Prometheus injected Plastic Man with a chemical that badly damaged his plastic body. The chemicals caused Eel to suffer from a condition where it took great concentration to keep himself in his usual, semi-solid state and caused him pain when he even thought about changing shape, thus leaving him in an infirm state.

In the Blackest Night crossover, while still suffering from his deteriorating state, Plastic Man had his heart torn out by the Black Lantern, Vibe, seemingly killing him. However, due to his power of near-invulnerability, he was able to survive such an attack, albeit badly wounded. Vixen states that Plastic Man was being taken care of at STAR Labs, and that he would be unable to return to the League.

Plastic Man later appeared in Justice League: Generation Lost, helping a large coalition of heroes on an unsuccessful mission to trace Maxwell Lord. He had been seemingly cured of his condition, and was shown retaining his normal shape without issue or pain.

Later, he aids the JLA on their mission into Hell, where he helps Batman defeat Geryon. The League learns Satanus' plans to use Dante's mask to become powerful. Plastic Man grabs the mask, which possesses him. The Leagues combines forces to remove the mask, which is incinerated, seemingly killing Plastic Man. It is later revealed that Zauriel transported him into another dimension before helping the League escape Hell.

The New 52
In September 2011, The New 52 rebooted DC's continuity. In this new timeline, Plastic Man is considered as one of the candidates for the United Nations-sponsored Justice League International. He is denied a spot on the team for being too unpredictable. This cameo appearance was later retconned by "Eel" O'Brian's proper New 52 introduction in Justice League (Vol. 2) #25 (February 2014).

DC Rebirth
In Dark Days: The Forge, Batman unveils a containment unit to Mister Terrific in The Lunar Batcave bearing the Plastic Man logo and suggests it is time to release him.

Plastic Man assists Mister Terrific into thwarting Simon Stagg's plot to open the portal to the Dark Multiverse using Metamorpho who had been transmuted to Nth Metal. While trying to get Simon Stagg to close the portal with the help of Plastic Man, Mister Terrific is sucked into the portal with Plastic Man and Metamorpho as Plastic Man shields them from the Dark Multiverse energy which he is immune to. Upon arriving on a lifeless world, they encounter Phantom Girl who has been trapped in her intangible form and who has no knowledge of sending a signal. When the four of them find a computer in the gut of a giant dead creature, they are greeted by a hologram of Tom Strong who states that they are needed to save the universe. Mister Terrific, Plastic Man, and Metamorpho learn from Phantom Girl that she was stuck in an intangible form since she was a child. After the four of them make it back to their world, Mister Terrific tries to leave the three of them at Simon Stagg's compound only to be drawn back to them. Due to the effects of the Dark Multiverse energy, Mister Terrific concludes that they can't go their separate ways due to this inescapable bond. The team goes through several adventures whilst being attacked by a figure known as Doctor Dread, who is later revealed to be Java. This revelation, coupled with the team being cured of their condition, causes everyone to split up. Plastic Man attempts to connect with his ex Angel and their son Luke, who has inherited his stretching powers. Initially reluctant, the two bond over a game of basketball and stealing the Batmobile. They are then called upon by the rest of the team to band together and save Mr. Terrifc from the Terribles, a team of their evil doppelgängers put together by Doctor Dread. Plas and Luke, now suited up in his Offspring look, work together to take down a vampiric version of Plastic Man from another dimension. Following the Terribles' defeat and imprisonment, the Terrifics officially reunite as a team, with Luke, Element Dog, and Miss Terrifics joining the roster.

Plastic Man was later recruited by Obscura to help investigate a multi-dimensional conspiracy. This led them to find that it was being committed by a group of villains called the Cabal.

Powers and abilities
Plastic Man's powers are derived from an accident in which his body was bathed in an unknown industrial chemical mixture that also entered into his bloodstream through a gunshot wound. This caused a body-wide mutagenic process that transformed his physiology. Eel exists in a fluid state, neither entirely liquid nor solid. He has complete control over his entire molecular structure. He can stretch his limbs and body to superhuman lengths and sizes. There is no known limit to how far Plastic Man can stretch his body. He can shrink himself down to a few inches tall (posed as one of Batman's utility belt pockets) or become a titan (the size of skyscrapers). He can contort his body into various positions and sizes impossible for ordinary humans, such as being entirely flat to slip under a door, using his fingers to pick conventional lock, compressing himself into a ball to ricochet off of things, and inflating his body. He can also use it for disguise by changing the shape of his face and body, contributory to his work as a sleuth. Due to his fluid state, Plastic Man can open holes in his body and turn himself into objects with mobile parts. In addition, he can alter his bodily mass and physical constitution at will, creating virtually no limit to the sizes and shapes he can contort himself into. There is nothing he cannot alter his body into, which includes basic shapes or dangerous weapons, avatars of other superheroes, and functional automobiles. These stretching capabilities grant Plastic Man agility, flexibility, and coordination far beyond the natural limits of the human body. He can alter his strength by growing or adding more muscle. Plastic Man's powers extraordinarily augment his durability. Some stories, perhaps of anecdotal quality, have showed him susceptible to surprise attack by bullets, in one case oozing a substance similar to liquid plastic. His unique physiology makes him impervious to conventional means of harm such as bullets, blasts, and blunt force. He is also able to withstand corrosives, punctures, and concussions without sustaining any injury (although he can be momentarily stunned). Batman once mentioned that he could presumably even withstand a nuclear detonation. This is mainly due to the fact that he has full control over his density, so he can willfully increase his durability as he wishes. His bodily mass can be dispersed, but for all intents and purposes, it is invulnerable, even from many forms of magic in the DC Universe. He is able to regenerate and/or assimilate lost or damaged tissue, although he needs to be reasonably intact for this process to begin. For example, Plastic Man was once reduced to individual, separate molecules and scattered across the Atlantic Ocean for centuries. He was only capable of returning to his usual form after the rest of the League were able to gather enough of his molecules and restore approximately 80% of his body mass, after which he began to regenerate the remaining 20% on his own.

Plastic Man has proven to be insusceptible to the effects of telepathy. As stated by Batman (in JLA #88, Dec. 2003), "Plastic Man's mind is no longer organic. It's untouchable by telepathy". Plastic Man does not appear to age; if he does, it is at a rate far slower than that of normal human beings. In the aftermath of the Justice League story Arc "Obsidian Age", Plastic Man was discovered to have survived for 3,000 years scattered into separate, individual molecules on the bottom of the Atlantic Ocean without decaying or being otherwise affected at all. He can autonomically detect ultrasonic frequencies because his body will start to "ripple" when an ultrasonic frequency is triggered. 

As stated by the Black Lantern corpsman Vibe, Plastic Man's internal organs (such as his heart when Black Lantern Vibe tried to rip it out) couldn't be removed, unlike many of the Black Lanterns' victims. This perhaps implies that Plastic Man is himself more like one giant, living organ than he is a "whole" made of component parts and organs, etc.  

His semi-liquid form remains stable at relatively high and low temperatures, provided that the temperature change is gradual. A sudden change induces a complete change of state, creating a truly solid or truly liquid form. Plastic Man was incapacitated in the JLA story arc "Tower of Babel" when mercenaries froze and shattered his body. Once thawed and reassembled, he was physically unharmed. In the JLA story arc "Divided We Fall", Plastic Man is shown to have some weakness to extreme heat (intense heat vision attack from a Martian) and was temporarily melted. In some versions, Plastic Man is also vulnerable to chemicals such as acetone, which melts and destabilizes his malleable form, although he eventually regenerated when the chemicals are gone. A famous hindrance of Plastic Man’s abilities is that the only colors he can mimic are the colors of his body and costume (i.e. red, black, yellow, white, and flesh tone), although he can use these colors in various ways, once even managing to exactly duplicate the appearance of the Flash. Whether this is an inherent flaw in his powers or a mental block has never been explained, whereas, his son, Offspring, also gained his father's powers, but is able to willfully mimic  any color he chooses. During Offspring's introduction, it was revealed that Plastic Man could change color, turning his nose blue to prove to Batman that he could. This color change, however, was possible only with a great deal of Plastic Man's concentration, even for such a very small area.

Plastic Man was once a very talented professional thief, specializing as a safecracker. Although no longer a criminal, he has thorough insight into their mindset, enabling him to be an effective sleuth. He is also considered to be a lateral thinker and much smarter than he lets on.

Enemies

Plastic Man has fought many enemies in his comics:
 Acid Tongue – A criminal who can spit acid at a target from several yards away.
 Abba and Dabba – Two wanted con-men.
 Ali Krim 
 Amorpho – A sentient blob of protoplasm from an unknown distant planet.
 Archie Type – A criminal that Plastic Man was after.
 Baldy Bushwhack 
 B. T. Tokus 
 Beauteous Bessie 
 Big Beaver 
 Bizarro – A backwards clone of Superman.
 Blind Ali – A blind would-be assassin.
 Boss Annova – The self-appointed king of all street crime in the city of Metropolis.
 Brain Trust 
 Brickface – A crime boss with a segmented face.
 Brotherhood of the Savage Caribou – 
 Bunyon O'Banyon 
 The Burning – Plastic Man was chosen by Batman to battle the Martian Manhunter when he was corrupted by The Burning.
 Cabal – A group of villains that were behind a multi-dimensional conspiracy and ran afoul of Plastic Man and Obscura.
 Amazo – An android that can copy the powers of the Justice League.
 Doctor Psycho – A dwarfish telepath and an enemy of Wonder Woman.
 Hugo Strange – A mad scientist and an enemy of Batman.
 Per Degaton – A supervillain obsessed with time travel.
 Queen Bee – An alien bee-themed criminal.
 Teel – 
 Carrot-Man – A criminal that dresses up as a carrot.
 Cauldron 
 Chatterbox – Lou Kwashus is a disc jockey-themed supervillain with a sonic weapon.
 Cheeseface – A cheese-themed criminal who has been selling explosive bottles of milk.
 Edam O'Grotton – Cheeseface's henchman.
 Closets Kennedy 
 The Crab 
 Desperate Desmond 
 Doctor Dome – A supervillain in a dome-shaped helmet. He is the closest thing Plastic Man has to an arch-enemy.
 Lynx – Doctor Dome's sidekick.
 Professor X – A scientist who Doctor Dome used to cause havoc.
 Doctor Forklift – A half-man, half-forklift scientist.
 Doctor Honctoff – An evil robotics genius.
 Bogus Men – A group of androids that were created by Doctor Honctoff.
 Dopey Joe 
 Dr. Ameeba 
 Dr. Erudite 
 Dr. Phobia 
 Dr. Volt 
 Dollmaker – Marcel Mannequin is an extremely talented dollmaker who uses sentient dolls to commit crimes.
 Electra 
 Even Steven – A balanced-obsessed criminal.
 Dr. Meg LeMania – Even Steven's scientist minion.
 Fargo Freddie, The Lava Man – An unappreciated and underpaid employee who transformed himself into living lava via active volcano.  
 Froggie Fink 
 The Gag Man 
 Goldzinger – A gold-magnetizing crook.
 Granite Lady – A former singer who turned down all men and her skin became rock-like, due to the serum's effects.
 The Grasshopper – An armed jewel thief who was subjected to a serum that granted him leaping abilities.
 The Green Terror 
 Hairy Arms – A gang leader who formerly served the Axis Powers, until his own pals found out and removed him from their group. 
 Hands 
 Hate 
 The Hotrod 
 Killer Joe – A professional hitman.
 King Lughead 
 King of Spades – The leader of a spade-themed gang.
 Jack of Spades – A member of the King of Spades' gang.
 Queen of Spades – A member of the King of Spades' gang.
 The King Of Zing 
 Kolonel Kool – Originally an agent at the NBI named Gulliver "Gully" Foyle, Plastic Man's success there at his expense made Foyle jealous and out for revenge. Kolonel Kool took over Boss Annova's gang before being nabbed by his former co-worker.
 Lawbook – He offers a reward to any crook who can find a way to kill Plastic Man.
 League of Assassins – An organization of assassins.
 Ra's al Ghul – The leader of the League of Assassins.
 Talia al Ghul – The daughter of Ra's al Ghul and member of the League of Assassins.
 Lex Luthor – The CEO of LexCorp and enemy of Superman who was working as the President of the United States at the time.
 The Lobster 
 Louie The Lift 
 Lowbrow – A short and insanely confident criminal who killed Cindy Bloch.
 Lucky 7
 Lucius D. Dratt, Doctor Dratt – A twisted neurochemist. 
 Madam Brawn – A teacher who trains female ex-cons at her school to fight men on equal grounds. Dies in Police Comics #5.  
 Madame Merciless – A female criminal hired by Doctor Dome to hypnotize Plastic Man.
 Madame Serpina – A sideshow entertainer-turned assassin. 
 Malleable Man – A criminal associate of Eel O'Brien who recreated the accident that gave Plastic Man his powers.
 Man-Bat – Kirk Langstrom is a zoologist who takes a serum that transforms him into Man-Bat. After being subdued by Plastic Man, Man-Bat agreed to help him and Obscura investigate a multi-dimensional conspiracy.
 The Mangler 
 The Master Artist 
 Max the Knife – A gang leader that went up against Marty "The Mouse" Meeker" after he was given powers by two aliens from the Redinskian race.
 Meat By-Product – A monster spawned from a meat by-product.
 Molder – A sculpting plastic-themed criminal who fought Plastic Man and Batman.
 Mona Mayhem 
 The Moon Wizard 
 Mostolo 
 The Moulder
 Mister Aqua – A former chemist who was experimenting with chemicals that turned him into living water. Woozy accidentally drank him. 
 Mr. Cat 
 Mister Green – A supervillain who became a plant-based lifeform and then, dies after reverting to human form.
 Mr. Happiness 
 Mr. Misfit 
 (The Melancholy) Mister Morbid – A criminal who is always sad and dislikes happiness.
 Mr. Stingker 
 Mister Uglee – A masked criminal with a terrifyingly hideous face who wanted to disfigure all other men so he would be the most handsome man in the world in comparison.
 Mister Wheels – The elderly leader of an organized crime ring called Crime Enterprises who confined himself to a wheelchair. 
 Murray "the Swede" Schneiderman – A bank robber.
 Number Seven 
 Ooze Brothers – Clem, Flem, and Lem are three villains who use ooze in their crimes.
 The Owl 
 Pinkeye – An albino spy.
 Pinky Flowers 
 Poison Ivy – A plant-themed enemy of Batman. Poison Ivy posed as Angel O'Brien to get revenge on Plastic Man.
 Prankster – An enemy of Superman who uses pranks in his criminal activities. He once used robot duplicates of the Justice League to fool the police that Plastic Man was a criminal.
 Professor Goodman 
 Professor Dimwit 
 Professor Spindrift
 Ramalama – 
 Red Herring – An anthropomorphic red herring who appears to meddle with the investigations of crimes he was not involved in.
 Remember 
 Rice O'Rooney – The "San Francisco Threat", he was considered to be the highest paid hitman in the country.
 Robby Reed – When Robby Reed's H-Dial was rusted, he ended up turning into evil versions of some of his hero forms.
 Rocky Goober 
 Roxanne Roller – A roller-skating villain seeking vengeance against rock stars who supposedly spurned her.
 Rubberneck – Perry Skope villain with super-strength and suggestions of a rubbery resiliency. This character appears in the Batman: The Brave and the Bold episode "Long Arm of the Law". An action figure was created based on this sole appearance.
 Puttyface – Mal E. Able is the partner of Rubberneck.
 Ruby Ryder – A ruthless business woman and owner of Ruby Ryder Inc. who fought Plastic Man and Batman. She first appeared in the Batman: The Brave and the Bold episode "Bold Beginnings!".
 SAPMALAL – Short for Society to Assassinate Plastic Man And Live A Little, they are a group who is out to eliminate Plastic Man.
 Assassin – A member of SAPMALAL who Plastic Man poses as.
 Ivan Byturnozov – A member of SAPMALAL.
 Jean Le Feet – A member of SAPMALAL.
 Lefty McGoon – A member of SAPMALAL.
 Sir Reginald Ratfinque – A member of SAPMALAL.
 Sadly Sadly – A man whose face is so pathetic that banks hand over money.
 Saxon – A crook who always speaks in alliteration.
 Skulllface – 
 Eloc – Eloc is Cole spelled backwards.
 Skunk – AKA the B.O. Bandit, the Skunk emanated an excruciatingly foul odor as a result of having never, in his entire life, bathed.
 Sleepy Eyes – A supervillain who puts people to sleep just by looking at them.
 Slick Dandy 
 Sludge – A monster spawned from sludge.
 Snuffer – A cyborg killer in the employ of Rice O'Rooney, the San Francisco hitman directed the mechanical assassin to kill Plastic Man for Boss Annova.
 Sphinx – A super-strong crook that once tried to take over Doctor Dome's territory.
 Stickyfinger – A criminal who has been sticking up a lot of people around Mammoth City.
 Stretcho 
 Supreme Leader – 
 Toyman – A toy-themed criminal and enemy of Superman. Plastic Man once helped Superman fight Toyman.
 Thrilla 
 Time Trapper II – Poison Ivy mind-controlled Metron to pose as Time Trapper.
 Weasel – Mr. Waisel is a criminal who took advantage of Plastic Man's amnesia.
 Weapons 
 Whirling Dervish – Big-toed ballet dancer turned assassin. Murdered by Pinkeye.
 Words 
 The Yes-Man – A crime boss who only says Yes until Plastic Man forces him to say No at which time he snaps. 
 Zircon –

Other versions

The Dark Knight Strikes Again
In Batman: The Dark Knight Strikes Again (2001—2002), Frank Miller's miniseries (set on DC's new Earth-31 in post-Infinite Crisis continuity), Plastic Man was betrayed and locked in Arkham Asylum for years with his body forced into a perpetual egg-like shape by a pressurizing machine. The imprisonment and confinement drove him insane, and upon his release he lashed out at those around him. He fights Elongated Man, having the upper hand until Batman brings Plastic Man to his senses with a punch to the face. Batman declares that Plastic Man is the most powerful superhero in the room. Carrie Kelley (as Catgirl) describes him as being: "Immeasurably powerful. Absolutely nuts". In this continuity, he appears with silver hair and a few wrinkles.

All Star Batman and Robin
Plastic Man appears in issue #5 All Star Batman and Robin, also written by Miller, as a founding member of a proto-Justice League along with Wonder Woman, Superman, and Green Lantern Hal Jordan.

Kyle Baker's Plastic Man
Plastic Man (2004–2006), written and illustrated by Kyle Baker, harkens back to the Jack Cole version of Plastic Man featuring Eel O'Brian tended to by a monk in a mountain retreat following the events of his normal origin story. Inspired by the monk's kindness, Eel resolves to use his powers for good, becoming the crime fighter Plastic Man, and works for the FBI. In this series, Plastic Man gets a girlfriend (FBI Special Agent Morgan, later revealed as the surgically-altered fiancée named Nancy who Plas' alter ego had left in the 1940s), and adopts a Goth teenage daughter, Edwina. The series won five Eisner Awards for Best New Series, Best Title for Younger Readers, Best Writer/Artist: Humor and one Harvey Award for Best New Series.

Tangent Comics
In the Tangent Comics imprint, set on the alternate universe Earth-9, Plastic Man is a member of the Secret Six. He is scientist Gunther Ganz, whose consciousness has been transferred to a "living polymer".

JLA/Avengers
In the DC Comics/Marvel Comics intercompany crossover JLA/Avengers, Plastic Man is a member of the JLA and teams with Martian Manhunter in the Marvel locale of Wakanda, where the two encounter the Marvel characters the Wasp and the Black Panther. Plastic Man is replaced by DC Comics' Elongated Man after the merging of worlds.

Flashpoint
In the alternate timeline of the Flashpoint event, Eel O'Brian is a villain. After Heat Wave was sent to death row for killing Jason Rusch, O'Brian arrives to break him out in the flying fortress of the military Doom prison, having been hiding, disguised in the body of his cellmate Cluemaster. During the prison break, O'Brian dislikes being called "Plastic Man", when inmate Sportsmaster calls him this. While O'Brian helps him to retrieve his weapons, he discovers Heat Wave attacking the guards' control room and attempting to ram the flying prison at Cyborg's home city of Detroit. O'Brian refuses to let him destroy the city, but Heat Wave turns on him and seems to kill Plastic Man by using his flame gun to melt his body. After Heat Wave is defeated by Cyborg and imprisoned in Belle Reve, O'Brian is revealed to have survived the flame gun attack and smuggles himself into the prison in Heat Wave's new cellmate's body, where he is later shown advancing on Heat Wave.

Wednesday Comics
In the collected edition of Wednesday Comics (200 pages, DC Comics, June 2010), Plastic Man is featured in a story by Evan Dorkin with art by Stephen DeStefano. Plastic Man and Woozy battle Professor Grushenko at the museum over a magic elixir with resulting hijinks.

Collected editions

In other media

Television
 A "Plastic Man" pilot was planned first by Hal Seeger Productions, then by Filmation.
 Plastic Man makes a cameo appearance in the Super Friends episode "Professor Goodfellow's G.E.E.C.", voiced by Norman Alden.
 Plastic Man appears in The Plastic Man Comedy/Adventure Show, voiced by Michael Bell. This version is an operative of an unnamed covert agency partnered with a bumbling Hawaiian sidekick named Hula-Hula, his girlfriend Penny, and eventually his son Baby Plas. Additionally, Taylor Marks portrays Plastic Man in the syndicated version of the series.
 Warner Bros. Animation and Cartoon Network commissioned a Plastic Man television pilot, "Puddle Trouble", in 2006, produced by Andy Suriano and Tom Kenny, with the latter also providing Plastic Man's voice, and designed and storyboarded by Stephen DeStefano. However, Cartoon Network decided not to pick up Plastic Man as a series and has never aired the episode. "Puddle Trouble" has been released on the Plastic Man: The Complete Collection DVD set.
 Plastic Man appears in Batman: The Brave and the Bold, voiced again by Tom Kenny. This version was originally an underling of Kite Man who lived in a suburban home with his family. While joining Kite Man for a heist, Batman intervened, inadvertently caused the accident that turned O'Brian into Plastic Man, and helped him become a superhero. Additionally, an Earth-Three counterpart of Plastic Man named Rubber Man makes a non-speaking appearance in the episode "Deep Cover for Batman!" as a member of the Injustice Syndicate.
 Plastic Man makes non-speaking cameo appearances in Young Justice. After joining the Justice League in the episode "Revelation", he joins Batman, among other Leaguers, in resigning from the group as part of a pre-planned response to U.N. secretary general Lex Luthor's numerous restrictions so they can operate as vigilantes.
 Plastic Man appears in the Mad segment "That's What Super Friends Are For", voiced by Dana Snyder.
 Plastic Man appears in Robot Chicken.
 Plastic Man appears in the DC Nation Shorts, voiced again by Tom Kenny.
 Plastic Man appears in Justice League Action, voiced again by Dana Snyder.

Film

Animation
 Plastic Man makes a non-speaking cameo appearance in Justice League: New Frontier.
 Plastic Man appears in Lego DC Comics Super Heroes: Justice League vs. Bizarro League, voiced again by Tom Kenny.
 Plastic Man appears in Scooby-Doo! & Batman: The Brave and the Bold, voiced again by Tom Kenny.
 Kevin Smith mentioned at Calgary Comic and Entertainment Expo that he met with Geoff Johns and pitched an animated Plastic Man film that he wrote for DC. He revealed that Jim Parsons was set to voice the character before the film got scrapped.
 Plastic Man appears in Lego DC Comics Super Heroes: The Flash, voiced again by Tom Kenny.
 Plastic Man appears in Teen Titans Go! To the Movies, voiced by Joey Cappabianca.
 Plastic Man appears in Injustice, voiced by Oliver Hudson.

Live-action

Warner Bros. Pictures began development on a film centered around Plastic Man, in the early 1990s with Amblin Entertainment producing and Bryan Spicer directing. The Wachowskis wrote the screenplay in 1995.

In December 2018, development for a new Plastic Man film was announced, with Amanda Idoko writing the screenplay and Robert Shaye as executive producer. Years later in December, it was reported that Cat Vasko was hired to rewrite Idoko's screenplay while the project is being reworked to be a female-centered movie.

Video games
 Plastic Man appears as a playable character in Batman: The Brave and the Bold – The Videogame, voiced again by Tom Kenny.
 Plastic Man appears as a summonable character in Scribblenauts Unmasked: A DC Comics Adventure.
 Plastic Man appears as a playable character in Lego Batman 3: Beyond Gotham, voiced by Dee Bradley Baker.
 Plastic Man appears as a playable character in Lego DC Super-Villains, voiced by JP Karliak.

Miscellaneous
 Plastic Man appears in the Injustice: Gods Among Us prequel comics. He speaks out against Superman's altered ethics following the Metropolis bombing, but does not get physically involved until Superman arrests his son, Luke. After rescuing Luke from the Regime's underwater prison, freeing the other prisoners in the process, Plastic Man encourages them to fight against Superman.
 Plastic Man appears in the Injustice 2 prequel comic as a member of Batman's Justice League Task Force.
 Plastic Man makes a cameo appearance in DC Super Hero Girls as a graduate of Super Hero High.

Magazines
The April 19, 1999, issue of The New Yorker features Plastic Man on the cover gawking at a Picasso painting. This issue ran a biography of Jack Cole by Art Spiegelman, which two years later would comprise much of the text in his and Chip Kidd's book Jack Cole and Plastic Man: Forms Stretched to Their Limits. In the 499th issue of Mad Magazine, Plastic Man can be seen in the magazine's Watchmen spoof during Funnyman's (spoof of Edward Blake/Comedian) funeral.

See also
 1941 in comics
 Stacey Augmon, a professional basketball player sometimes nicknamed "Plastic Man".

Similar characters
 Elongated Man, another DC Comics character with similar powers.
 Elasti-Girl, a fellow DC Comics hero from Doom Patrol who can stretch as well.
 Elastic Lad, Superman's pal Jimmy Olsen who gains Plastic Man-like powers when drinking a special serum.
 Lastikman, a Filipino character with similar powers developed by Mars Ravelo in 1964.
 Monkey D. Luffy, a manga character who has abilities similar to Plastic Man, starring in the Japanese comic One Piece.
 Mister Fantastic, a Marvel Comics superhero from Fantastic Four, with abilities similar to Plastic Man.
 Poly Mer of PS238, a gender-swapped child version of Plastic Man with similar abilities and personality.
 Thin Man, another elastic superhero from Marvel Comics, who first appeared in Marvel's predecessor, Timely Comics.
 Flatman, another Marvel hero with the ability to stretch.
 Tiramolla, an Italian comic book character with a similar elastic body.

References

Further reading
 Jack Cole and Plastic Man: Forms Stretched to Their Limits, by Art Spiegelman and Chip Kidd (Chronicle Books, 2001)

Characters created by Jack Cole
Comics characters introduced in 1941
DC Comics American superheroes
DC Comics characters who are shapeshifters
DC Comics characters with accelerated healing
DC Comics characters with superhuman strength
DC Comics male superheroes
DC Comics metahumans
DC Comics orphans
Fictional characters who can stretch themselves
Fictional characters with immortality
Fictional characters with superhuman durability or invulnerability
Fictional Federal Bureau of Investigation personnel
Fictional professional thieves
Golden Age superheroes
Quality Comics superheroes